Joshua Benjamin Miller (born February 7, 1979) is an American professional baseball coach for the Houston Astros of Major League Baseball (MLB).

Career
Miller attended Melbourne High School, Brevard College, and North Carolina State University. He was drafted by the Philadelphia Phillies in the 32nd round of the 2001 MLB draft. He played in Minor League Baseball and Independent baseball from 2001 through 2010.

He then worked for the Houston Astros as a scout, coach, and coordinator from 2011 through 2018. The Astros hired Miller as their bullpen coach before the 2019 season.  In 2022, the Astros won 106 games, the second-highest total in franchise history.  They advanced to the World Series and defeated the Philadelphia Phillies in six games to give Miller his first career World Series title.   Astros pitchers led the American League (AL) in earned run average (ERA, 2.90), and walks plus hits per inning pitched (WHIP, 1.092), while throwing two no-hitters, including one in Game 4 of the World Series.

References

External links

Houston Astros coach bio

1979 births
Living people
Baseball coaches from Florida
Baseball players from Florida
Baseball pitchers
Batavia Muckdogs players
Bridgeport Bluefish players
Caribes de Anzoátegui players
Clearwater Phillies players
Corpus Christi Hooks players
Houston Astros coaches
Major League Baseball bullpen coaches
Minor league baseball coaches
NC State Wolfpack baseball players
New Jersey Jackals players
People from Melbourne Beach, Florida
Reading Phillies players
Round Rock Express players
Somerset Patriots players
Tigres de Aragua players
American expatriate baseball players in Venezuela